The Yucatan jay (Cyanocorax yucatanicus) is a species of bird in the family Corvidae, the crows and their allies. Immature birds have yellow bills. This is a common species of jay with a wide range and the International Union for Conservation of Nature has rated its conservation status as being of "least concern".

Range and habitat
It is found primarily in the Yucatán Peninsula, which comprises the northern part of the nation of Belize; and Guatemala's northern El Petén Department and the Mexican states of Yucatán, Quintana Roo and Campeche. It is also present in parts of the neighbouring states of Chiapas and Tabasco.

Description
Adults are black, with cerulean blue wings, mantle, and tail. They have black bills, yellow eye rings, and yellow legs. Juvenile Yucatán jays have completely yellow bare parts and white, rather than black, body plumage. They molt out of the white plumage by September or October, but retain the yellow bill and eye ring for a few more months. They also have pale-tipped rectrices, which the adults lack.

Status
The Yucatan jay is a common species throughout most of its wide range. It is an adaptable species and the population is thought to be increasing as clearing of forests is creating new areas of suitable habitat. No particular threats have been identified, and the International Union for Conservation of Nature has rated its conservation status as being of  "least concern".

References

External links

 
 
Photo; Article world.std.com–"Mexican Birds: Villahermosa and Palenque" Photo-2
 
 

Yucatan jay
Birds of Belize
Birds of the Yucatán Peninsula
Least concern biota of North America
Yucatan jay
Taxonomy articles created by Polbot